Martin Memorial may refer to the following:

Buildings and structures
Ava Bill Martin Memorial Airport in Ava, Missouri
Josephine Martin Glidden Memorial Chapel in Sioux Falls, South Dakota
Kuala Klawang Memorial in Kuala Klawang, Malaysia; also known as the Martin Lister Memorial
Malcolm W. Martin Memorial Park in East St. Louis, Illinois

Sculptures
Death and the Sculptor, a bronze sculpture also known as the Martin Milmore Memorial
General Jose de San Martin Memorial

See also
Martin Luther King Jr. Memorial
Martin Luther King Jr. Memorial Library
Memorials to Martin Luther King Jr.
List of streets named after Martin Luther King Jr.
List of memorials to Martin Van Buren